Darvari may refer to:

 Dârvari, Romania
 Darvari, Bulgaria